Paulo André Camilo de Oliveira (often called Camilo to avoid homonymy, born 20 August 1998) is a Brazilian sprinter. In the 100 metres, he was a silver medalist at the 2019 Pan American Games, and a semifinalist in the World Athletics Championships of the same year. He also won the 4 × 100 metres relay at the 2019 World Relays.

At the 2019 Troféu Brasil de Atletismo he managed to run the 100 m in a time of 9.90 seconds, but the time was not ratified due to the wind conditions.

Professional athletics career 
He is the son of a former sprinter Carlos José Camilo de Oliveira, who represented Brazil in the 1980s.

He began to stand out by participating in the team from Brazil that won the 2019 World Relays, held in Yokohama, Japan, with a mark of 38.05. At the 2019 Summer Universiade in Naples, Italy, he won two gold medals in the 100 m and 200 m sprints. He won the 100 m with the 10.09 mark.

In 2016 his best mark in the 100 m was 10.26, evolving to 10.18 in 2017. On September 14, 2018, he obtained the 10.02 mark for the first time, the second best mark in the history of Brazil in the 100m, only behind to Robson da Silva, with 10.00. He repeated the 10.02 time in April 2019.

At the 2019 Pan American Games, held in Lima, Peru, he won the silver medal in the 100 m, event that Brazil has not won a medal since 1999, and gold in Brazil's  relay.

In August 2019, at the Troféu Brasil de Atletismo, he won the 100m with the 9.90 mark, which was just not validated as a new South American Record because it was obtained with a wind of +3.2 m/s (the limit is + 2 m/s).

In late September 2019, he went to the World Athletics Championships in Doha, Qatar, where he won his 100 m heat with a mark of 10.11. The last time a Brazilian had gone to a semifinal in this event was in Gothenburg in 1995. He was just 0.03s from qualifying for the final: he finished 12th overall, with a mark of 10.14 in the semis, while the 8th and last classified for the final got 10.12.

He qualified to represent Brazil at the 2020 Summer Olympics.

International competitions

1Disqualified in the final

Personal life
In 2022, Oliveira was cast as contestant in the reality show Big Brother Brasil 22. He came in 2nd place to actor and singer Arthur Aguiar.

References

External links

1998 births
Living people
Brazilian male sprinters
People from Santo André, São Paulo
Athletes (track and field) at the 2019 Pan American Games
Pan American Games gold medalists for Brazil
Pan American Games silver medalists for Brazil
Pan American Games medalists in athletics (track and field)
Pan American Games athletes for Brazil
Universiade gold medalists in athletics (track and field)
Universiade gold medalists for Brazil
Medalists at the 2019 Summer Universiade
Medalists at the 2019 Pan American Games
Ibero-American Championships in Athletics winners
Troféu Brasil de Atletismo winners
Athletes (track and field) at the 2020 Summer Olympics
Olympic athletes of Brazil
Big Brother (franchise) contestants
Big Brother Brasil
Sportspeople from São Paulo (state)